Kate Newmann (born 1965) is an Irish poet and founder of the small poetry press Summer Palace Press.

Life and work
Kate Newmann was born in 1965 in Dromore, Co. Down. She is the daughter of Joan Newmann. Educated in Cambridge, an English graduate with an MA from King's College, Cambridge she went on to be a junior fellow at the Institute for Irish Studies, Queen's University Belfast. She was editor there and compiled The Dictionary of Ulster Biography.

She is co-founder, with her mother of the Summer Palace Press, begun in 1999, and lives in Kilcar near Killybegs, Donegal.

Awards
 William Allingham Poetry Award
 The Swansea Award
 The Listowel Festival single poem award.  
 Irish Arts Council Bursary 2007 recipient 
 2008 Commended in the National Poetry Competition
Review by John McAuliffe in the Irish Times:Newmann knows her subjects must not be understood as an exception or aberration: the book's most effective poems are those which struggle into quandaries, linking the Holocaust to a world we recognise.[...] Grim is a challenging book, but there is nothing glib about the way it responds to its historical material.

Bibliography 
 The Dictionary of Ulster Biography (1993)
 The Blind Woman in The Blue House (2001)
 Belongings (2007)
 Grim (2015)
 I am a Horse (2011)
 How Well Did You Love?

References

Further reading 
 The Watchful Heart - A New Generation of Irish Poets - Poems and Essays Edited and Presented by Joan McBreen 2009
 Christine St. Peter, 'In Conversation with Joan and Kate Newmann: Irish Poets and Publishers', in Canadian Journal of Irish Studies/Revue canadienne d'études irlandaises, 28, 2/29, 1 (Fall 2002/Spring 2003), pp.148-53.

Irish women novelists
Irish poets
1965 births
Living people